Doug MacKenzie may refer to:

 Doug MacKenzie (Family Affairs), a character on the soap opera Family Affairs
 Doug MacKenzie (Canadian football) (born c. 1938), Canadian football player

See also
Doug McKenzie (disambiguation)